How Dare You! is a children's game show that aired on ITV from 10 April 1984 to 15 July 1987.

Transmissions

Series

Specials

External links

1980s British game shows
1980s British children's television series
1984 British television series debuts
1987 British television series endings
British children's game shows
English-language television shows
ITV children's television shows
ITV game shows
Television series by ITV Studios
Television shows produced by Tyne Tees Television